Hurricane Norbert marked the first time a core of a hurricane was fully mapped in three-dimensions. First forming on September 14, 1984 west of the Mexican coast, Norbert gradually intensified, reaching hurricane intensity two days after formation. On September 22, Norbert peaked in strength as a Category 4 hurricane on the Saffir-Simpson Hurricane Scale. While intensifying, Norbert meandered. It moved east, then north, then west, then south, then back towards the east, and finally towards the northeast. After fluctuating in intensity for two more days, Norbert rapidly weakened. It turned towards the northwest and made landfall in southern Baja California Norte as a tropical storm. The combination of Norbert and several other storms left thousands homeless throughout Mexico. The remnants of Hurricane Norbert produced moderate rain over Arizona.

Meteorological history

A tropical depression first developed on September 14 over the Pacific Ocean west of the Mexican coast. Six hours later, the depression intensified into Tropical Storm Norbert. Gradually strengthening, Norbert meandered in the weak steering currents for several days. The rate of intensification accelerated early on September 16, and shortly thereafter Norbert became a hurricane.

On September 17, Norbert turned from the east to the north, and upon attaining Category 2 status on the Saffir–Simpson Hurricane Scale at 18:00 UTC the next day, Norbert began to turn back to the west. Several hours later, Norbert was upgraded to a major hurricane (Category 3 or higher). While maintaining its intensity for two and a half days, Norbert then turned to the south and after slight strengthening, back to the east. Meanwhile, a deep layer ridge over the Rocky Mountains was replaced by an upper-level trough, which extended south of Cabo San Lucas. This change in the steering patterns caused Hurricane Norbert to eventually turn to the northwest.

Norbert fluctuated in intensity; six hours after its peak Norbert weakened back into a Category 3 hurricane, only to regain Category 4 strength on three separate occasions during the next 48 hours. On September 23, a Hurricane Hunter aircraft was flown into Norbert and measured a  eye and a closed eyewall. Another aircraft reconnaissance flew into the hurricane and observed that the heaviest precipitation was located on the eastern semicircle and that the storm's windfield was asymmetrical. Repeated penetrations were made into the eyewall, and scientists mapped a hurricane three-dimensional  wind field for the first time.

Although the hurricane's motion accelerated, by 0000 UTC September 25, Norbert was only a mid-level Category 2 hurricane. After weakening back into a tropical storm early on September 26 , the system moved ashore near Point Abreojos in the central portion of the Baja California Peninsula as a high-end tropical storm, where the EPHC ceased tracking the system. According to the National Weather Service office in Tucson, surface and satellite observations suggested that Norbert survived as a tropical depression over into Arizona. If Norbert had done so, it would have been one of the eight tropical cyclones to survive into the state.

Preparations and impact
Due to the storm's large circulation, authorities in Mazaltan issued weather alerts to warn shipping "to exercise extreme caution" from Jalisco to Baja California Sur. The Eastern Pacific Hurricane Center noted the possibility of heavy rains and flooding across portions of the Baja California Peninsula. Under the anticipation of heavy rains in Arizona, flash flood watches were hoisted across several counties and some school districts near Tucson released students early owing to those concerns. However, flooding was not anticipated to be as severe as that from Tropical Storm Octave the previous year.

In the small fishing communities of Punta Abreojos and La Bocana along the coastline, 90% of structures were demolished, which resulted in 4,000 homeless individuals. One person was killed and more than US$140 million in damage occurred there. Initially, nine fisherman were reported missing, but eight of the nine were later safely found. As a result of Norbert and a combination of other storms that hit the country in 1984, crop losses were estimated at US$60 million, mostly from corn, beans, wheat, rice and sorghum.

About 50 roads were closed in Pima County, including 30 in Tucson. Across southwestern New Mexico, flash flood warnings were posted due to heavy rainfall. The rains extended as far west as Texas, where more than  fell; these rains caused flooding in Abilene.

See also

1984 Pacific hurricane season
List of Pacific hurricanes
Other cyclones named Norbert
List of Category 4 Pacific hurricanes

Notes

References

Norbert 1984
Norbert 1984
Norbert 1984
Norbert